Santa Cruz Province may refer to
Santa Cruz Province, Argentina
Santa Cruz Province, Peru
Province of Santa Cruz de Tenerife, Spain

See also
Santa Cruz (disambiguation)
Santa Cruz Department (disambiguation)